The Stolen Treaty is a 1913 American drama film featuring Harry Carey.

Cast
 Lionel Barrymore as The Japanese Diplomat
 Claire McDowell as Olga
 Reggie Morris as Olga's Friend
 Harry Carey as The Detective
 William J. Butler as A Diplomat

See also
 Harry Carey filmography
 Lionel Barrymore filmography

External links

1913 films
1913 drama films
1913 short films
Silent American drama films
American silent short films
American black-and-white films
Films directed by Anthony O'Sullivan
1910s American films